Waldemar Rösler (1882-1916) was a German Impressionist landscape painter and lithographer.

Biography 
His father was a photographer. When he was still very young, the family moved to Königsberg where he later became an illustrator at a local newspaper.  From 1896 to 1904, he attended the Kunstakademie there; studying with Max Schmidt,  and Ludwig Dettmann, who admitted him to his Master Class. That is where he met his future wife, a student who would also become a well-known artist.

After a brief study trip to Paris and Brussels, he had his first exhibition in 1905 with the Berlin Secession. This was followed by a stay in Gut Schildeck, located between Osterode and Hohenstein, which was his fiancées birthplace. They were married in 1906 and settled in Groß-Lichterfelde, near Berlin. The following year, they had twins. Their daughter, also became an artist.

In 1908, at the 15th showing of the Secession, Max Liebermann became aware of his work and invited him to become a member. In 1911, following Liebermann's resignation, he became a member of the advisory board, under the sponsorship of Max Beckmann. He was also a member of the Deutscher Kunstlerbund 

After the mobilization in 1914, he was drafted into the Landwehr and sent to the Western Front in Belgium. The following year, he was promoted to Lieutenant for his bravery. After that, he was assigned to the Occupation Administration in Brussels, where he worked with Gottfried Benn, who was then serving as a military doctor.

Not long after his arrival, he committed suicide. He was buried in his wife's family plot in Gut Schildeck. 

During the Nazi régime, some of his works were classified as "degenerate". In 2004, after many years as a café, his summer home in Kühlungsborn became the Museum Atelierhaus Rösler-Kröhnke. The latter name refers to his son-in-law, Walter Kröhnke and granddaughter ; also artists.

References

Further reading 
 Helmut R. Leppien: Eine Künstlerfamilie - drei Generationen: Waldemar Rösler, Oda Hardt-Rösler, Walter Kröhnke, Louise Rösler, Anka Kröhnke. (exhibition catalog) Museum für Kunst und Gewerbe Hamburg, 1988.

External links 

 Museum Atelierhaus Rösler-Kröhnke website
 ArtNet: More works by Rösler.
 Drawings by Rösler @ MoMA
 Drawings by Rösler @ LACMA

1882 births
1916 deaths
20th-century German artists
German Impressionist painters
Painters who committed suicide
Artists from Dresden
1916 suicides
German Army personnel of World War I
German military personnel who committed suicide